Vinod Kumar (born 20 July 1980) is an Indian athlete who specializes in the discus throw. He participated in the men's discus throw at the 2020 Paralympics and won bronze but was later disqualified after being found not eligible to participate in the event.

Kumar was banned from competition for two years after being found to have intentionally misrepresented his impairment in classification, resulting in his competing against more severely impaired athletes. The ban will expire in August 2023.

Personal life
Vinod Kumar was born in Rohtak, Haryana. He joined the Border Security Force where his legs were injured in a fall from a cliff in Leh during training. His father fought in the Indo-Pakistani War of 1971.

References

1980 births
Living people
People from Rohtak
Indian male discus throwers
Paralympic athletes of India
Athletes (track and field) at the 2020 Summer Paralympics
Competitors stripped of Paralympic medals